Harmancık can refer to:

 Harmancık
 Harmancık, Bayramören
 Harmancık, Çorum
 Harmancık, Lapseki